The boys' doubles of the tournament 2022 BWF World Junior Championships is an individual badminton tournament to crowned the best boys' doubles under 19 pair across the BWF associate members around the world. Players will compete to win the Eye Level Cup presented by the former BWF President and chairman of the World Youth Culture Foundation, Kang Young Joong. The tournament will be held from 24 to 30 October 2022 in the Palacio de Deportes de Santander, Spain. The defending champions were Leo Rolly Carnando and Daniel Marthin from Indonesia, but they were not eligible to participate this year.

Seeds 

  Jakob Houe / Christian Faust Kjær (fourth round)
  Daniel Franco / Rubén García (quarter-finals)
  Jarne Schlevoight / Nikolaj Stupplich (third round)
  Putra Erwiansyah / Patra Harapan Rindorindo (final)
  Maël Cattoen / Lucas Renoir (second round)
  Natan Begga / Baptiste Labarthe (second round)
  Choi Jian Sheng / Bryan Goonting (fourth round)
  Apilik Gaterahong / Witchaya Jintamuttha (semi-finals)

  Nicolas Franconville / Lorrain Joliat (second round)
  Nge Joo Jie / Johann Prajogo (quarter-finals)
  Simon Bailoni / Ilija Nicolussi (second round)
  Ricardo Rettig / Rodrigo Sanjurjo (second round)
  Volodymyr Koluzaiev / Nikita Yeromenko (fourth round)
  David Eckerlin / Simon Krax (fourth round)
  Raymond Indra / Daniel Edgar Marvino (second round)
  Fazriq Razif / Wong Vin Sean (second round)

Draw

Finals

Top half

Section 1

Section 2

Section 3

Section 4

Bottom half

Section 5

Section 6

Section 7

Section 8

References

External links 
Draw

2022 BWF World Junior Championships